Júlio Silva (born 1 July 1979) is a professional tennis player from Brazil who turned professional in 1999.

He reached his highest singles ATP-ranking of World No. 144 in November 2009.

ATP and Grand Slam titles (12)

Singles (4)

Doubles (8)

ATP and Grand Slam runners-up (10)

Singles (4)

Doubles (6)

External links

 
 
 

1979 births
Living people
Brazilian male tennis players
People from Jundiaí
Sportspeople from São Paulo (state)
21st-century Brazilian people
20th-century Brazilian people